John Henry Wotiz (April 12, 1919 – August 21, 2001) was a Czech-American chemist in the areas of organic chemistry and chemical history.

Career 
Wotiz began studying of chemical engineering at the Czech Technical University in Prague, but went to the USA with his brother in 1939 because of the German occupation of Czechoslovakia. In 1941 he received a Bachelor's degree in chemistry from Furman University and in 1943 a Master's degree from the University of Richmond. At the end of World War II he served in the United States Army as Lieutenant of chemical weaponry. In 1944 he became a US citizen. In 1948 he earned a PhD in chemistry under Melvin S. Newman at Ohio State University.

Wotiz was an instructor and from 1954 an associate professor at the University of Pittsburgh. He went to work in industry at the Diamond Alkali Company in Painesville in 1957. There he was involved in authoring 44 patents. In 1962 he became a professor at Marshall University in Huntington, West Virginia, and in 1967 at Southern Illinois University in Carbondale.

In 1980 Wotiz was Chairman of the History Division of the American Chemical Society. Starting in 1971 he organized trips to Europe regarding the history of chemistry. As a chemical historian, he was particularly concerned with August Kekulé. He was involved in establishing a center for the history of chemistry, the Chemical Heritage Foundation (now the Science History Institute).

Wotiz retired in 1989. He was particularly committed to international exchange with Eastern Europe and was involved in comparative studies of chemical education in the Soviet Union, Eastern Europe and Asia. He and his wife Kathryn died as a result of a car accident on August 21, 2001.

Awards 
In 1982 Wotiz received the Dexter Award, in part for his contributions to the establishment of a center for the history of chemistry. In 1998 he was awarded an honorary doctorate by the Technical University of Ostrava (in his home town) after receiving their gold medal in 1982.

Works

References

External links
 

1919 births
2001 deaths
20th-century American chemists
Historians of chemistry
University of Richmond alumni
Ohio State University Graduate School alumni
20th-century American historians
American male non-fiction writers
People from Ostrava
Czech Technical University in Prague alumni
Furman University alumni
Czech chemists
University of Pittsburgh faculty
Southern Illinois University Carbondale faculty
Czechoslovak emigrants to the United States
Marshall University faculty
People with acquired American citizenship
20th-century American male writers